The Statute Law Revision Act 1891 (54 & 55 Vict c 67) is an Act of the Parliament of the United Kingdom.

This Act was partly in force in Great Britain at the end of 2010.

This Act was retained for the Republic of Ireland by section 2(2)(a) of, and Part 4 of Schedule 1 to, the Statute Law Revision Act 2007.

Section 2
This section was repealed by section 32(4) of, and Part V of Schedule 5 to, the Administration of Justice Act 1977.

Schedule
The Schedule to this Act was repealed by section 1 of, and the Schedule to, the Statute Law Revision Act 1908 (8 Edw 7 c 49).

See also
Statute Law Revision Act

References
The Public General Acts passed in the fifty-fourth and fifty-fifth years of the reign of Her Majesty Queen Victoria. HMSO. London. 1891. Pages 363 to 447.

External links
List of amendments and repeals in the Republic of Ireland from the Irish Statute Book

United Kingdom Acts of Parliament 1891